Denisse Iridane Franco Piña (born March 3, 1998) is a Mexican model and beauty pageant titleholder who won Miss Mexico 2022 and represented Mexico at the Miss World 2023 pageant.

Franco was previously won Nuestra Belleza México 2017 and represented Mexico at the Miss Universe 2017 pageant, but she failed to enter the Top 16 semifinals, and she was the last candidate to hold the title of Nuestra Belleza Mexico before the organization changed its name to Mexicana Universal.

Personal life
Franco was born in Culiacán, Sinaloa, Mexico.  She works as a professional model.

Pageantry
Franco was crowned Nuestra Belleza Sinaloa in her hometown.  On March 11, 2017, she won the national title of Nuestra Belleza México 2017.

Franco represented Mexico at the Miss Universe 2017 pageant in Las Vegas on November 26, 2017, but did not place.

References

1998 births
Living people
Mexican beauty pageant winners
Miss Universe 2017 contestants
Nuestra Belleza México winners
Mexican female models
People from Culiacán